Paul Anthony Atkin (born 3 September 1969 in Nottingham, England) is an English former footballer who played in the Football League for Bury, York City, Leyton Orient and Scarborough.

Biography
Atkin was born in Nottingham on 3 September 1969. He started his football career as a trainee with Notts County in July 1987, and moved to Bury in March 1989 for whom he made 21 appearances, scoring one goal. He joined York City on a free transfer in July 1991, made 153 league appearances in five seasons, scoring three goals, and was part of the promotion-winning team of 1993. He went to Leyton Orient on loan in March 1997, making five league appearances, and transferred to Scarborough in August 1997, for whom he made 36 league appearances, scoring once.

References

External links

1969 births
Living people
Footballers from Nottingham
English footballers
Association football defenders
Notts County F.C. players
Bury F.C. players
York City F.C. players
Leyton Orient F.C. players
Scarborough F.C. players
English Football League players